Truksa is a surname originating from Czechoslovakia.  The meaning of the name is unknown. The surname Truxa is a recent derivative, being a misspelling by German officials during the Second World War

Distribution 
Persons with the Truksa or Truxa name are currently known to inhabit several parts of the United States
(including Texas, Nebraska, Idaho, and Connecticut), as well as the countries of the Czech Republic, Germany, the United Kingdom, Slovakia, Brazil, and parts of Canada (including Quebec, Ontario, and Alberta).

It is believed, yet not verified, that other persons with the Truksa surname may have immigrated to Australia in the early 20th century, contributing to the possibility of a current population of families with the Truksa surname in that country.

Notable people
Notable people with the surname Truksa or Truxa include:
Helena Truksa, Biologist, Animal Behavior and Animal Welfare Specialist, founder at Ethos Animal, from Brazil. She also conducts the non profit project "Cockatiels of Brazil" (Projeto Calopsitas do Brasil)".
 Jaromír Truksa, professional table tennis player from Slovakia.
Karel Truksa, dispatcher and co-conspirator in the hijacking of the Freedom Train.
Margarethe Truxa, second wife of Heinrich Harrer.

References 

 United States Federal Immigration Records
 Census Records
 http://www.ancestry.com Ancestry.com

Surnames
Surnames of Czech origin